Alifokpa or Aliforkpa is a community in Yache Ward in Yala Local Government Area of Cross River State, Nigeria. The language spoken by the people is Ekpari (Akpa). The natives are predominantly farmers who specialize in growing Yam, Cassava, Rice, Pepper, Garden Egg and Groundnut production.

The community is made up of three clans namely; Echuji, Enduchui and Aji.
It observes a five days a week calendar. These are: Ogereje, Odama, Ogbada, Akpakpa and the last being Ogidi is the market day. The community is closely knit together by unique cultural antiquities such as the famous traditional dances (Igana, Otsichui, Ayeta and Akataka). The New Yam festival is annually observed on 25 August, whereby the yearly bumper harvest is celebrated.

LOCATION 
Alifokpa is located in the north east of the region Yala.

PLACES 
Places in or around Alifokpa includes the following

 Acraha
 Alhokpa
 Chakpu
 Eja
 Gabu
 Ije
 Ipule -Endichui
 Mbor
 Mbur
 Oshina
 Uchu

References 

Populated places in Cross River State